The Economic and Philosophic Manuscripts of 1844, also referred to as the Paris Manuscripts or as the 1844 Manuscripts, are a series of notes written between April and August 1844 by Karl Marx, published posthumously in 1932.

The notebooks were compiled in their original German in the Soviet Union by researchers at Moscow's Marx–Engels–Lenin Institute, decades after Marx's death. They were first released in Berlin in 1932, and in 1933, there followed a republication of this work in the Soviet Union (Moscow-Leningrad), also in German. Their publication greatly altered the reception of Marx by situating his work within a theoretical framework that had until then been unavailable to his followers.

Context
The Manuscripts were composed during the summer of 1844, when Marx was 25 or 26 years old. Marx was at this time resident in Paris, then seen as the center of socialist thought. Several members of the philosophical milieu that he then belonged to, the Young Hegelians, had moved to Paris in the previous year to establish a journal, the Deutsch–Französische Jahrbücher. Marx himself had taken up residence in 38 Rue Vaneau, in the Left Bank of the city, in October 1843. In Paris, he came into contact with German revolutionary artisans and secret meetings of French proletarian societies. It was in this period that Marx made the acquaintance of Pierre-Joseph Proudhon, Louis Blanc, Heinrich Heine, Georg Herwegh, Mikhail Bakunin, Pierre Leroux and most importantly, Friedrich Engels.

The Manuscripts evolved from a proposal Marx had made in the Jahrbücher to write separate pamphlets critiquing the various topics of Georg Wilhelm Friedrich Hegel's philosophy of law—law, morals, politics, etc.—ending with a general treatise that would show their interrelations. The notebooks are a fragmentary, incomplete work, that range from extracts from books with comments, loosely connected notes and reflections on various topics, to a comprehensive assessment of Hegel's philosophy. The work is best known for its articulation of Marx's argument that the conditions of modern industrial societies result in the estrangement (or alienation) of wage-workers from their own products, from their own work, and in turn from themselves and from each other.

The text marks the first appearance together of what Engels described as the three constituent elements in Marx's thought: German idealist philosophy, French socialism and English economics. In addition to Hegel, Marx addresses the work of various socialist writers, and that of the fathers of political economy: Francois Quesnay, Adam Smith, David Ricardo, Jean-Baptiste Say, and James Mill. Die Bewegung der Produktion by Friedrich Wilhelm Schulz is also a key source. Ludwig Feuerbach's humanism is an influence that underlies all of Marx's notes.

Because the 1844 Manuscripts show Marx's thought at the time of its early genesis, their publication in the twentieth century profoundly affected analysis of Marx and Marxism. At the time of their first publication, their most striking feature was their dissimilarity to the philosophy of dialectical materialism that was official within the Soviet Union and the European Communist Parties. The Manuscripts offer a trenchant analysis of Hegel that is far more difficult and complex than the "dialectics of nature" that Georgi Plekhanov and his disciple Lenin had derived from Engels's Anti-Dühring.

Terminology
István Mészáros notes that the language and terminology of the Manuscripts is one of the work's main difficulties. He mentions that a key term "Aufhebung" can be translated from German to English simultaneously as "transcendence", "suppression", "preserving" and "overcoming". Christopher J. Arthur comments that the term, which appears in Hegel's Science of Logic, has in ordinary language the double meaning of "to abolish" and "to preserve".  Arthur translates the word as "supersede" when the stress is more on abolition, and as "sublate" when the emphasis is more on preservation. Gregory Benton translates the word as "transcendence" and "supersession", and notes that Marx's concept of "critique" is an instance of this double movement.

A second terminological difficulty is the translation of the German words "Entäusserung" and "Entfremdung". While both words can be translated to English as "alienation", Entfremdung is often translated as "estrangement" and Entäusserung as "alienation", to draw a distinction between the two concepts. Christopher J. Arthur notes that Entäusserung is an unusual German word that can also be translated as "renunciation", "parting with", "relinquishment", "externalization", "divestiture" or "surrender". Arthur believes "externalization" is the closest of these translations, but he avoids using this word as it may be confused with a distinct term that Marx uses elsewhere: "Vergegenständlichung" or "objectification". Arthur claims "Entfremdung" is a narrower concept than "Entäusserung" in that it applies only to cases of interpersonal estrangement. He takes estrangement to be a state and alienation to be a process.

The dialectical structure of Marx's theory is another difficulty of the text, as the definition of certain key concepts can be hard to understand for those trained in positivist and empiricist philosophical traditions. What is more, the meaning of certain terms borrowed from Marx's contemporaries such as Feuerbach is often changed by Marx's appropriation of them.

Themes 

In the Manuscripts, Marx relates economic categories to a philosophical interpretation of man's position in nature. Marx's notebooks provide a general philosophical analysis of the basic concepts of political economy: capital, rent, labor, property, money, commodities, needs, and wages. Their key concept appears when Marx uses philosophical terminology to advance a critique of capitalist society based in "alienation". Marx's theory is adapted (not without changes) from Hegel's Phenomenology of Spirit (1807) and Feuerbach's The Essence of Christianity (1841). Alienation is not merely a descriptive concept, it is a call for de-alienation through radical change of the world.

Alienated labor 
Marx's first manuscript consists largely of extracts or paraphrases from the works of the classical economists, such as Adam Smith, that Marx was reading at the time of the Manuscripts''' composition. Marx here levels a number of criticisms at classical political economy. Marx argues that economic concepts do not deal with man as a human being, but as one would a house, a commodity, reducing the greater part of mankind to abstract labor. Marx follows Smith's definition of capital as the power of command over labor and its products. He disagrees with Smith's distinction between a landlord and a capitalist, claiming that the character of landed property has been transformed from feudal times so that society is now (increasingly) divided into only two classes: workers and capitalists. He further criticizes the conception of labor found in the classical economists on grounds that their conceptions are superficial and abstract. Marx argues that the classical economists start with a fictional primordial state that takes concepts such as private property, exchange and competition as facts, without seeing a need to explain them. Marx believes he has offered a more coherent account that addresses the connection and the history of these factors.

Marx explains how capitalism alienates man from his human nature. Man's basic characteristic is his labor, or his commerce with nature.
In earlier societies people could rely in part on nature itself to satisfy "natural needs". In modern society, where land ownership is subject to the laws of a market economy, it is only through money that one may survive. A worker's labor and his product have become alien from him. His productive powers are a commodity to be bought and sold like any other, at the market price determined by the minimum cost of maintenance. The worker does not toil to satisfy his need to work, but only to survive: "he receives an object of labor, i.e., in that he receives work, and, secondly, in that he receives means of subsistence. This enables him to exist, first as a worker; and second, as a physical subject. The height of this servitude is that it is only as a worker that he can maintain himself as a physical subject and that it is only as a physical subject that he is a worker." While his work produces wealth for the capital class, the worker himself is reduced to the level of an animal. If the wealth of society is diminishing, it is the worker who suffers the most; if it is increasing, then capital is increasing and the product of labor is increasingly alienated from the worker.

The modern productive process does not promote the development and deployment of essential human capacities. Human individuals thus experience their lives as lacking meaning or fulfillment; they feel "estranged" or do not feel at home in the modern social world. Marx argues that the worker is alienated in four ways:

 From the product he produces
 From the act by which he produces this product
 From his nature and himself
 From other human beings

The relation of the worker to the objects of his production is the primary cause of his impoverishment and dehumanization. The object produced by a worker's labor stands as an alien thing, a power independent of its producer. The more the worker produces, the more he approaches loss of work and starvation. Man is no longer the initiator in his interchange with the world outside himself; he has lost control of his own evolution. Marx draws an analogy with religion: in religion, God is the subject of the historical process, and man is in a state of dependence. The more man attributes to God, the less he retains in himself. Similarly, when a worker externalizes his life in an object, his life belongs to the object and not to himself. The object confronts him as hostile and alien. His nature becomes the attribute of another person or thing.

The act of production of the object is the second dimension of alienation. It is forced labor and not voluntary. The labor is external to the worker and not part of his nature. The worker's activity belongs to another, causing the loss of his self. The worker is only at ease in his animal functions of eating, drinking and procreating. In his distinctly human functions, he is made to feel like an animal.

The third dimension of alienation that Marx discusses is man's alienation from his species. Marx here uses Feuerbachian terminology to describe man as a "species-being". Man is a self-conscious creature who can appropriate for his own use the whole realm of inorganic nature. While other animals produce, they produce only what is immediately necessary. Man, on the other hand, produces universally and freely. He is able to produce according to the standard of any species and at all times knows how to apply an intrinsic standard to the object. Man thus creates according to the laws of beauty. This transformation of inorganic nature is what Marx calls man's "life-activity", and it is man's essence. Man has lost his species-being because his life-activity has been turned into a mere means of existence.

The fourth and final dimension of alienation is drawn from alienation's other three dimensions: Marx believes that man is alienated from other men. Marx has argued that the product of a worker's labor is alien and belongs to someone else. The worker's productive activity is a torment for the worker; it must therefore be the pleasure of another. Marx asks who is this other person? Since the product of man's labor does not belong to nature nor to the gods, these two facts point out that it is another man who has control of a man's product and a man's activity.

From his analysis of alienation, Marx draws the conclusion that private property is the product of externalized labor, and not the reverse. It is the relation of the worker to his labor that produces the relation of the capitalist to labor. Marx attempts to bring forth from this that social labor is in turn the source of all value and thus of the distribution of wealth. He argues that while the classical economists treat labor as the basis of production, they give nothing to labor and everything to private property. For Marx, wages and private property are identical, as they are both consequences of the alienation of labor. An increase in wages does not restore labor to its human meaning and significance. The emancipation of the workers will be the achievement of universal human emancipation, because the whole of human servitude is involved in the relation of the worker to production.

 Communism 
Marx discusses his conception of communism in his third manuscript. For Marx, communism is "the positive expression of the abolition of private property". Marx here claims that previous socialist writers had offered only partial, unsatisfactory insights on the overcoming of alienation. He mentions Proudhon, who advocated the abolition of capital, Fourier, who advocated a return to agricultural labor and Saint-Simon, who advocated the correct organization of industrial labor. Marx discusses two forms of communism that he deems inadequate. The first is "crude communism"—the universalization of private property. This form of communism "negates the personality of man in every sphere," as it does not abolish the category of worker but instead extends it to all men. It is an "abstract negation of the entire world of culture and civilization." Here the only community is a community of (alienated) labor and the only equality is one of wages paid out by the community as universal capitalist. The second form of communism that Marx sees as incomplete is of two sorts: "(a) still of a political nature, democratic or despotic; (b) with the abolition of the state, but still essentially incomplete and influenced by private property, i.e. by the alienation of man." David McLellan takes Marx to here refer to the utopian communism of Etienne Cabet as democratic, the despotic communism to be the dictatorship of the proletariat advocated by the followers of Gracchus Babeuf, and the abolition of the state to be the communism of Théodore Dézamy.

Having discussed the nature of "crude communism", Marx describes his own idea of communism:

Marx discusses three aspects of his conception of communism in depth: its historical bases, its social character and its regard for the individual.

Marx firstly draws a distinction between his own communism and other "underdeveloped" forms of communism. He cites the communism of Cabet and Francois Villegardelle as examples of communism that justify themselves by appealing to historical forms of community that were opposed to private property. Where this communism appeals to isolated aspects or epochs of past history, Marx's communism, on the other hand, is based in the "entire movement of history"; it finds "both its empirical and its theoretical basis in the movement of private property, or to be more exact, of the economy." The most basic alienation of human life is expressed in the existence of private property, and this alienation occurs in man's real life—the economic sphere. Religious alienation occurs only in man's consciousness. The overcoming of private property will thus be the overcoming of all other alienations: religion, the family, the state, etc.

Marx secondly claims that the relation of man to himself, to other men and to what he produces in an unalienated situation shows that it is the social character of labor that is basic. Marx believes that there is a reciprocal relationship between man and society: society produces man and is produced by him. Just as there is a reciprocal relationship between man and society, so is there between man and nature: "society is therefore the perfected unity in essence of man with nature, the true resurrection of nature, the realized naturalism of man and the realized humanism of nature." Man's essential capacities are produced in social intercourse: when working in isolation, he performs a social act by virtue of being human; even thinking, which uses language, is a social activity.

This emphasis on the social aspects of man's being does not destroy man's individuality: "Man, however much he may therefore be a particular individual—and it is just this particularity which he makes him an individual and a real individual communal being—is just as much the totality, the ideal totality, the subjective experience of thought and experienced society for itself."

The rest of Marx's third manuscript explicates his conception of the total, all-sided, unalienated man. Marx believes the supersession of private property will be a total liberation of all human faculties: seeing, hearing, smelling, tasting, touching, thinking, observing, feeling, desiring, acting and loving will all become means of appropriating reality. It is difficult for alienated man to imagine this, as private property has conditioned men so that they can only imagine an object to be theirs when they actually use it. Even then, the object is only employed as a means of sustaining life, which is understood as consisting of labor and the creation of capital. Marx believes that all physical and intellectual senses have been replaced by a single alienation—that of having. The "supersession of private property", Marx claims, "is therefore the complete emancipation of all human senses and attributes." Need or satisfaction will lose their egoistic nature, and nature will lose its mere utility "in the sense that its use has become human use". When man is no longer lost in an object, the manner in which his faculties appropriate the object becomes totally different. The object that unalienated man appropriates corresponds to his nature. A starving man can only appreciate food in a purely animal way, and a dealer in minerals sees only value, and not beauty, in his wares. The transcendence of private property will liberate man's faculties to become human faculties. A full and harmonious development of man's cultural potentialities will arise, where abstract intellectual oppositions—"subjectivism and objectivism, spiritualism and materialism, activity and passivity"—will disappear. "The practical energy of man" will instead tackle the real problems of life.

In a passage that anticipates Marx's later detailed accounts of historical materialism, Marx next claims that it is the history of industry—rather than that of religion, politics and art—that reveals man's essential faculties. Industry reveals man's capabilities and psychology and is thus the basis for any science of man. The immense growth of industry has allowed natural science to transform the life of man. Just as Marx earlier established a reciprocal relationship between man and nature, so does he believe that natural science will one day include the science of man and the science of man will include natural science. Marx believes that human sense-experience, as described by Feuerbach, can form the basis of a single all-embracing science.

 Critique of Hegel 
The section of the Manuscripts that follows Marx's discussion of communism concerns his critique of Hegel. Marx deems it necessary to discuss the Hegelian dialectic because Hegel has grasped the essence of man's labor in a manner that was hidden from the classical economists. Despite his abstract and mental understanding of labor, Hegel has correctly discerned that labor is the creator of value. The structure of Hegel's philosophy accurately reflects the real economic alienation of man in his work process. Marx believes Hegel has made very real discoveries but has "mystified" them. He argues that Feuerbach is the only critic who has a constructive attitude to Hegel. However, he also uses Hegel to illuminate weaknesses in Feuerbach's approach.

The greatness of Hegel's dialectic lies in its view of alienation as a necessary stage in mankind's evolution: humanity creates itself by a process of alienation alternating with the transcendence of that alienation. Hegel sees labor as an alienating process that realizes the essence of man: man externalizes his essential powers in an objectified state, and then assimilates them back into him from outside. Hegel understands that the objects which appear to order men's lives—their religion, their wealth—in fact belong to man and are the product of essential human capacities. Nonetheless, Marx criticizes Hegel for equating labor with spiritual activity and alienation with objectivity. Marx believes Hegel's mistake is to make entities that belong objectively and sensuously to man into mental entities. For Hegel, the transcendence of alienation is the transcendence of the object—its reabsorption into the spiritual nature of man. In Hegel's system, the appropriation of alien things is only an abstract appropriation, which takes place in the realm of consciousness. While man suffers from economic and political alienation, it is only the thought of economics and politics that interests Hegel. Because Man's integration with nature takes place on a spiritual level, Marx views this integration as an abstraction and an illusion.

Marx holds that Feuerbach is the only one of Hegel's disciples who has truly conquered the master's philosophy. Feuerbach has succeeded in showing that Hegel, having started from the abstract, infinite point of view of religion and theology, then superseded this with the finite and particular attitude of philosophy, only to then supersede this attitude with a restoration of the abstraction typical of theology. Feuerbach sees this final stage as a regression, to which Marx agrees.

Hegel believes that reality is Spirit realizing itself, and that alienation consists in men's failure to understand that their environment and their culture are emanations of Spirit. Spirit's existence is constituted only in and through its own productive activity. In the process of realizing itself, Spirit produces a world that it initially believes is external, but gradually comes to understand is its own production. The aim of history is freedom, and freedom consists in men's becoming fully self-conscious.

Marx rejects Hegel's notion of Spirit, believing that man's mental activities—his ideas—are by themselves insufficient to explain social and cultural change. Marx comments that while Hegel talks as though human nature is only one attribute of self-consciousness, in reality self-consciousness is only one attribute of human nature. Hegel believes that man can be equated with self-consciousness, since self-consciousness has only itself for an object. Moreover, Hegel views alienation as constituted by objectivity and the overcoming of alienation as primarily the overcoming of objectivity. Against this, Marx argues that if man were merely self-consciousness then he could only establish outside himself abstract objects that have no independence via-a-vis his self-consciousness. If all alienation is the alienation of self-consciousness, then actual alienation—alienation in relation to natural objects—is only apparent.

Marx instead sees man as an objective, natural being who has real natural objects that correspond to his nature. Marx calls his view "naturalism" and "humanism". He distinguishes this view from idealism and materialism, yet claims it unifies what is essentially true in both. For Marx, nature is that which is opposed to man, yet man is himself a part of the system of nature. Man's nature is constituted by his needs and drives, and it is through nature that these essential needs and drives are satisfied. As such, man needs objects that are independent of him to express his objective nature. A being that is neither an object itself nor has an object would be the only existing being—a non-objective abstraction.

Following this discussion of human nature, Marx comments on the last chapter of Hegel's Phenomenology. Marx criticizes Hegel for equating alienation with objectivity, and for claiming that consciousness has transcended alienation. According to Marx, Hegel holds that consciousness knows that its objects are its own self-alienation—that there is no distinction between the object of consciousness and consciousness itself. Alienation is transcended when man feels at one with the spiritual world in its alienated form, believing it to be a feature of his authentic existence. Marx differs fundamentally from Hegel on the meaning of "transcendence" (Aufhebung). While private property, morality, the family, civil society, the state, etc. have been "transcended" in thought, they remain in existence. Hegel has arrived at genuine insight into the process of alienation and its transcendence: atheism transcends God to produce theoretical humanism and communism transcends private property to produce practical humanism. However, in Marx's view, these attempts to arrive at humanism must themselves be transcended to generate a self-creating, positive humanism.

Needs, Production, the Division of Labor and Money
In the concluding portions of the Manuscripts, Marx reflects on the morality of private property and the meaning of money. This discussion is within the same framework as the first section on wages, rent and profit. Marx claims that private property artificially creates needs in order to bring men into dependence. As men and their needs are at the mercy of the market, poverty increases and men's living conditions become worse than those of animals. In line with this, political economy preaches utter asceticism and reduces the needs of the worker to the miserable necessities of life. Political economy has its own private laws, since alienation separates activities into different spheres, often with different and contradictory norms. Marx mentions that classical economists wish to limit the population and think even people a luxury. He then returns to the topic of communism. He claims that the situation in England provides a surer basis for the transcendence of alienation than that in Germany or France: the form of alienation in England is based in practical need, whereas German communism is based on an attempt to establish universal self-consciousness and the equality of French communism has merely a political foundation.

Marx returns to the dehumanizing effects of capital in the second half of this section. He discusses the declining rate of interest and the abolition of land rent, as well as the question of the division of labor.
In the next section on money, Marx quotes Shakespeare and Goethe to argue that money is the ruin of society. Since money could purchase anything, it could remedy all deficiencies. Marx believes that in a society where everything would have a definite, human value, only love could be exchanged for love, etc.

Publication and reception
The Manuscripts were published for the first time in Moscow in 1932, as part of the Marx-Engels-Gesamtausgabe edition. They were edited by David Ryazanov under whom György Lukács worked in deciphering them. Lukács would later claim that this experience transformed his interpretation of Marxism permanently. On publication, their importance was recognized by Herbert Marcuse and Henri Lefebvre: Marcuse claimed that the Manuscripts demonstrated the philosophical foundations of Marxism, putting "the entire theory of 'scientific socialism' on a new footing"; Lefebvre, with Norbert Guterman, was the first to translate the Manuscripts into a foreign language, publishing a French edition in 1933. Lefebvre's Dialectical Materialism, written in 1934–5, advanced a reconstruction of Marx's entire body of work in the light of the Manuscripts.
In spite of this intense interest, copies of the published volumes of the Manuscripts subsequently became difficult to locate, as the Marx–Engels-Gesamtausgabe project was effectively cancelled shortly afterward.

The text became more widely disseminated after the Second World War, with satisfactory editions appearing in English only in 1956, and in French in 1962. In this period, Galvano Della Volpe was the first to translate and discuss the Manuscripts in Italian, propounding an interpretation that differed greatly from that of Lukács, Marcuse and Lefebvre and that inspired its own school of thought. Many Catholic writers, particularly those in France, took interest in the Manuscripts at this time. The existential Marxism of Maurice Merleau-Ponty and Jean-Paul Sartre also drew heavily from the Manuscripts. In the US, the Manuscripts were embraced enthusiastically in the late fifties and early sixties by the intellectual current subsequently known as the New Left, with a volume containing an introduction by Erich Fromm published in 1961.

Since the terminology of alienation does not appear in any prominent manner in Marx's magnum opus Capital, the publication of the Manuscripts caused great debate regarding the relationship of the "Young Marx" to the "Mature Marx". The Manuscripts were the most important reference for "Marxist humanism", which saw continuity between their Hegelian philosophical humanism and the economic theory of the later Marx. Conversely, the Soviet Union largely ignored the Manuscripts, believing them to belong to Marx's "early writings", which expound a line of thought that had led him nowhere. The structural Marxism of Louis Althusser inherited the Soviet Union's harsh verdict of Marx's early writings. Althusser believed there was a "break" in Marx's development - a break that divides Marx's thought into an "ideological" period before 1845, and a scientific period after. Others who ascribed a break to Marx idealized the Manuscripts and believed the young Marx to be the real Marx. Marxist economist Ernest Mandel distinguishes three different schools of thought with respect to this controversy:

 See also 
 Marx-Engels-Gesamtausgabe Young Marx
 Marxist aesthetics
 Marxist humanism
 History and Class Consciousness by György LukácsThe Principle of Hope by Ernst Bloch

References
Footnotes

Bibliography

 
 
 
 
 
 
 
 
  
 
 
 
 
 
 
 
 
 
 
 
 

 Further reading 

Arthur, Chris. 1982. "Objectification and Alienation in Marx and Hegel." Radical Philosophy 30.
—— 1983. "Hegel, Feuerbach, Marx and Negativity." Radical Philosophy 35.
—— 1986. Dialectics of Labour: Marx and His Relation to Hegel. Oxford: Basil Blackwell.
Berman, Marshall. [1999] 2018. "Adventures in Marxism. Jacobin  05.05.2018.
Erich Fromm. [1961] 1966. "Marx's Concept of Man. New York: Frederick Ungar Publishing Co.
Marcuse, Herbert. [1932] 1972. "The Foundation of Historical Materialism." In Studies in Critical Philosophy''. Boston: Beacon Press.

External links 
HTML text: Economic & Philosophical Manuscripts of 1844
PDF text: Economic and Philosophic Manuscripts of 1844
Original German text

1932 non-fiction books
Books by Karl Marx
Communist books
Philosophical literature
Books published posthumously